(born on January 12, 1982) is a female Japanese singer and actress from Tokyo, Japan. She has also played the role of Minako Aino in the Sailor Moon musicals from 2001 to 2002.

Anime voice roles
Happiness! (Opening theme)
Kappa no Kaikata
Kenkō Zenrakei Suieibu Umishō (Kaori Himekawa)
Kono Aozora ni Yakusoku wo (Ending theme)
Lamune (Ending theme)
Memories Off 3.5 - Omoide no Kanata e (Ending theme and Kanata Kurosu)
Myself ; Yourself (Hinako Mochida)
Academy Wasshoi!

Visual novel voice roles
Happiness! (Ending Theme)
Myself ; Yourself (Hinako Mochida and one of the ending themes)
Memories Off ~sorekara again~ (Opening theme and Kanata Kurosu)
Omoide ni Kanata Kimi ~Memories Off~ (Kanata Kurosu)

External links
 Ayumi Murata's official website 
 

1982 births
Living people
Japanese voice actresses
Anime musicians
Singers from Tokyo
Actresses from Tokyo
21st-century Japanese singers
21st-century Japanese women singers